Nicholas Andrew "Nick" Catlin (born 8 April 1989) is an English field hockey player who plays as a midfielder.

Catlin is from Marlow, and attended John Hampden Grammar School.

Club career
Catlin has played club hockey in England for Holcombe, Reading, Loughborough Students and East Grinstead. He also played for Racing Bruxelles in Belgium. He joined Rotterdam in the Dutch Hoofdklasse in 2017. After one season he left Rotterdam and he returned to Belgium to play for Beerschot.

International career
Catlin made his international debut in 2009.  Catlin competed for the Great Britain national team at the 2012 and 2016 Summer Olympics.  He won a bronze medal with the England team at the 2014 Commonwealth Games, scoring a penalty in the shootout against New Zealand which decided the bronze medal match.

References

External links
 
 
 

1989 births
Living people
English male field hockey players
Olympic field hockey players of Great Britain
British male field hockey players
Male field hockey midfielders
2010 Men's Hockey World Cup players
Field hockey players at the 2012 Summer Olympics
2014 Men's Hockey World Cup players
Field hockey players at the 2014 Commonwealth Games
Field hockey players at the 2016 Summer Olympics
Commonwealth Games medallists in field hockey
Commonwealth Games bronze medallists for England
Loughborough Students field hockey players
Holcombe Hockey Club players
East Grinstead Hockey Club players
Reading Hockey Club players
People educated at John Hampden Grammar School
Royal Beerschot THC players
Men's Belgian Hockey League players
HC Rotterdam players
Men's Hoofdklasse Hockey players
Royal Racing Club Bruxelles players
Medallists at the 2014 Commonwealth Games